Staněk (feminine Staňková) is a Czech-language surname. Notable people include:
 Blanka Staňková, Czech volleyball player
 Eliška Staňková, Czech athlete
 František Staněk, Czech rower
 Jaroslav Staněk, Czech table tennis player
 Jindřich Staněk, Czech footballer
 Roman Staněk, Czech racing driver
 Sonja Stanek, Austrian figure skater
 Tomáš Staněk, Czech athlete
 Tomáš Staněk (historian), Czech historian
 Willibald Stanek, Austrian ice hockey player

See also 

 Stanek (disambiguation)

Czech-language surnames